Lavagh (meaning 'Elmwood, Land Abounding in Elms') is a townland in County Leitrim, Ireland in the district of Drumkeeran.

References

Townlands of County Leitrim